Under the Red Robe is a 1915 British silent historical film directed by Wilfred Noy. An adventure story set in the era of Cardinal Richelieu, it is based on the novel of the same name which was turned into two later films including Undthe Red Robe (1937).

Cast
 Owen Roughwood as Gil de Berault  
 Dorothy Drake as Renee de Cochefort  
 Jackson Wilcox as Cardinal Richelieu  
 Sydney Bland as M. de Cochefort

References

Bibliography
 Low, Rachael. History of the British Film, 1914-1918. Routledge, 2005.

External links

1915 films
1910s historical films
British historical films
Films directed by Wilfred Noy
British silent feature films
Films set in France
Films set in the 1620s
British black-and-white films
1910s English-language films
1910s British films